Neptis serena, the serene sailer or river sailer, is a butterfly in the family Nymphalidae. It is found in Senegal, Gambia, Guinea-Bissau, Guinea, Sierra Leone, Ghana, Togo, Nigeria, Cameroon, the Republic of the Congo, the Democratic Republic of the Congo, Ethiopia, Tanzania, Zambia, northern Botswana, Zimbabwe, Mozambique, South Africa and Yemen. The habitat consists of open, grassy banks of streams and rivers in forests, heavy woodland, coastal bush and savanna.

Adult males mud-puddle. Adults are on wing from April to January.

The larvae feed on Cycina species.

Subspecies
Neptis serena serena (Senegal, Gambia, Guinea-Bissau, Guinea, Sierra Leone, Ghana, Togo, Nigeria, Cameroon, Congo, Democratic Republic of the Congo, Ethiopia, Tanzania, Zambia, northern Botswana, Zimbabwe, Mozambique, South Africa: KwaZulu-Natal)
Neptis serena annah Larsen, 1982 (Yemen)

References

Butterflies described in 1955
serena